Billy Martindale (born September 10, 1938) is an American professional golfer who has also had career interests as a white-tailed deer breeder, golf course designer, and oil & gas entrepreneur.

Life and career
Martindale was born in Jacksonville, Texas, the son of Margaret ( Pruitt) and William Everett Martindale. He is the older brother of Emmy Award-winning stage, television, and film actress Margo Martindale. He graduated from Jacksonville High School in 1957, where he was an All-State quarterback and All-State golfer. He was also the National Junior Skeet Shooting Champion in 1948-1950 at the ages of 10, 11, and 12.

Prior to his professional golf career, Martindale was an accomplished amateur player. After transferring from Southern Methodist University to Texas A&M University in the middle of his freshman year, he went on to captain the golf team and become an NCAA All-American his junior and senior years, graduating in 1961. After graduation, he served in the Army from 1962 to 1963.

After playing a partial season in 1963, Martindale played full-time on the PGA Tour from 1964 to 1968, and was recognized as the PGA's "Sophomore of the Year" in 1965. In his five years on tour, he had three 2nd-place finishes, five 3rd-place finishes, and 35 top-25 finishes. His best finish in a major was a tie for 15th at the 1966 PGA Championship at Firestone Country Club.

After the 1968 season, Martindale left the PGA Tour to partner with Don January to form JanMart Enterprises, a golf course development and design company. Their business partnership would last until 1979, when January left to join the Senior PGA Tour upon reaching age 50. 

In their 10 years together, Martindale and January developed some 23 courses together, mostly around their home state of Texas. Their most notable course development is Royal Oaks Country Club in Dallas, Texas, home to notable golfers Harrison Frazar, Justin Leonard, D. A. Weibring, Lee Trevino, and Colt Knost. During that time Martindale also served as the head coach of the Southern Methodist University golf team from 1970-73.

Since 1980, Martindale has ventured into several other successful businesses including casinos, white-tailed deer breeding, real estate, and oil & gas.

References

American male golfers
Texas A&M Aggies men's golfers
PGA Tour golfers
College golf coaches in the United States
Golf course architects
Golfers from Texas
Southern Methodist University alumni
People from Jacksonville, Texas
1938 births
Living people